Sarvati Istiqlol (formerly: Kalinin) is a jamoat in Tajikistan. It is located in Kushoniyon District in Khatlon Region. The jamoat has a total population of 33,071 (2015).

References

Populated places in Khatlon Region
Jamoats of Tajikistan